Frank Depestele (born 3 September 1977) is a retired Belgian volleyball player and current coach. He is 1.91 m tall and played as a setter. He was a regular player on the national team of which he was also captain. He has won several different individual prizes, including that for Best Setter in the CEV Champions League and Greek Volley League MVP.

Teams

Honors
Belgium
Belgian volley league: 2005, 2006, 2010
Belgian volley cup: 2005, 2006, 2011
Belgian volley supercup: 2004, 2005
Greece
Greek Volleyball League:2007
Greek Super Cup: 2007

References

External links
 

Living people
1977 births
Belgian men's volleyball players
Fenerbahçe volleyballers
Panathinaikos V.C. players
Iraklis V.C. players
VC Lokomotyv Kharkiv players
People from Tienen
Sportspeople from Flemish Brabant